QWSTION is a Swiss bag company that was founded in 2008 by Sebastian Kruit, industrial designers Christian Kaegi and Fabrice Aeberhard, graphic designer Matthias Graf and Johannes Schoenegger. QWSTION creates bags and other products made from natural materials and have developed Bananatex, a technical textile made from the fibres of the Abacá banana plant.

History 
The company was created to design bags that are ‘sustainable, aesthetically pleasing and functional’ – attributes that, according to the founders, were not offered by existing products. The name QWSTION is a portmanteau of the phrase "questioning the norm".  The first collections introduced in 2008 were made from linen/cotton canvas. In 2014, the company produced their first in-house material development: a Global Organic Textile Standard (GOTS) certified organic cotton canvas.

In October 2018 QWSTION launched Bananatex, a technical textile they had developed from the fibres of the Abacá banana plant. The plants are grown in the Philippines using sustainable forestry practises and is so robust that it doesn't require any pesticides, fertilisers or artificial irrigation. The raw fibres are processed into a functional fabric, coated with natural wax for water-repellency.

Bags 
QWSTION produces bags in both Bananatex and organic cotton and designs its bags to be worn for multiple purposes including business and leisure as well as allowing easier repairability.

Collaborations 
QWSTION has collaborated with several other companies on products:

 DNS: co developed with QWSTION a waterproof jacket made from very densely woven organic cotton fabric which is similar in design to fabric used by army parachutes used in World War 2. This collaboration was awarded the 2016 Bundespreis of Eco-Design Germany.
 Lehni: co-developed an outdoor chair using the Bananatex fabric.
 Rafael Kouto: the Swiss fashion designer worked with QWSTION to upcycle bags which had been returned.
 Mover: QWSTION + Mover are both working to elimination of plastic from their products. They have collaborated to produce the Hip Pack, a lightweight bag for outdoor use. The limited edition bags are produced in Switzerland from QWSTION's Cradle to Cradle Certified Bananatex material combined with wool and aluminium.

Production 
QWSTION sources and develops almost all materials itself in collaboration with suppliers. The company focuses on sustainability, using natural materials instead of plastics and other processes which pollute the environment. QWSTION works with three manufacturing partners in Switzerland, China and the Czech Republic. T&S, QWSTION's partner in Huizhou, China, is Business Social Compliance Initiative (BSCI) certified. Nähwerk, a Charity initiative in Zürich, Switzerland, produces the smaller or limited quantity products e.g. QWSTION + Kunsthaus Zurich Shoppers and Etuis.

Legal 
QWSTION AG is a registered public limited company in Zurich, Switzerland. All operational business is run through QWSTION International GmbH in Austria and QWSTION Schweiz GmbH in Switzerland. Bananatex AG is a spin off company registered in Zug, Switzerland.

Awards and certificates 
QWSTION has been awarded several prizes, most of them for sustainability and the development of Bananatex.

 2021: Cradle-to-cradle certification® Gold
 2021: German Sustainability Award 2021 Winner, Category: Pioneers
 2019: German Federal Ecodesign Award 2019 Winner (Bundespreis Ecodesign 2019), Category: Bananatex® by QWSTION
 2019: Design Preis Schweiz Winner, Category: Textile Design
 2019: Green Product Award 2019 Winner, Category: Material for Bananatex® by QWSTION
 2019: Cannes Corporate Media and TV Awards 2019 – Gold in category: Marketing Communication B2C for Bananatex
 2019: Holzbaupreis Tirol 2019 Winner (Wood Building Prize 2019), Category: Commercial Building for QWSTION International GmbH, Seefeld, Austria
 2018: Goldener Hase Winner, Category: Design for Bananatex® by QWSTION
 2016: German Federal Ecodesign Award 2016 Winner (Bundespreis Ecodesign 2016), Category: Product for All-Weather-Coat by QWSTION and DNS

External links 

 QWSTION website
 Bananatex website

References 

Bags (fashion)
Fashion
Textile companies